Spellbound is an album by jazz saxophonist Clifford Jordan which was recorded in 1960 and released on the Riverside label.

Reception

The Allmusic site awarded the album 4 stars with the review by Scott Yanow stating, "At this point, Jordan did not quite have the distinctive sound that he would develop in his period with Charles Mingus, but he was already a strong hard bop stylist... It's an excellent straight-ahead outing"

Track listing
All compositions by Clifford Jordan except as indicated
 "Toy" - 4:25     
 "Lush Life" (Billy Strayhorn) - 5:15     
 "Moon-A-Tic" - 4:41     
 "Spellbound" - 5:54     
 "Hot Water" - 5:06     
 "Last Night When We Were Young" (Harold Arlen, Yip Harburg) - 6:30     
 "Au Privave" (Charlie Parker) - 8:31

Personnel
Clifford Jordan — tenor saxophone
Cedar Walton - piano
Spanky DeBrest - bass
Albert Heath - drums

References

1960 albums
Clifford Jordan albums
Riverside Records albums